Moffen is a small, low island north of the mouth of Wijdefjorden, on the northern coast of Spitsbergen, the largest island of the Svalbard archipelago.  The island lies just north of 80° so has become a popular target for vessels touring the archipelago but landing or entering the inner waters is strictly forbidden for fear of disturbing the wildlife as the island is an important haul-out area for Walrus and a nesting site for birds.  The island was first labelled on a map by Hendrick Doncker, of Amsterdam, in 1655.

References

Conway, W. M. 1906. No Man's Land: A History of Spitsbergen from Its Discovery in 1596 to the Beginning of the Scientific Exploration of the Country. Cambridge: At the University Press. 
 Norwegian Polar Institute: Place names in Norwegian polar areas

Islands of Svalbard
Nature reserves in Svalbard